Ostap Safin (born 11 February 1999) is a Czech professional ice hockey forward. He is currently playing for HC Sparta Praha of the Czech Extraliga (ELH).

Playing career
Safin made his Czech Extraliga debut playing with Sparta Prague during the 2015–16 Czech Extraliga season.

Safin was drafted by the Edmonton Oilers in the 4th round, 115th overall, in the 2017 NHL Entry Draft. Shortly after this he was picked 53rd overall by the Saint John Sea Dogs of the QMJHL in the 2017 CHL Import Draft. After this he made the move to North America to play for the Sea Dogs during the 2017–18 season.

During a productive rookie season with the Sea Dogs, Safin agreed to a three-year, entry-level contract with the Oilers on March 6, 2018. Safin played out the regular season with the Sea Dogs, leading the club in scoring with 26 goals and 32 assists for 58 points to be named the club's rookie of the year. With the Dogs finishing out of playoff contention, Safin embarked on his North American professional career to be assigned to the Oilers AHL affiliate, the Bakersfield Condors, on March 20, 2018.

At the conclusion of his entry-level contract with the Oilers, Safin as an impending restricted free agent opted to return to the Czech Republic and re-join his original club, HC Sparta Praha, by agreeing to a two-year contract on 26 May 2022.

Career statistics

Regular season and playoffs

International

References

External links

1999 births
Living people
Bakersfield Condors players
Czech ice hockey right wingers
Czech people of Russian descent
Edmonton Oilers draft picks
Halifax Mooseheads players
Saint John Sea Dogs players
HC Sparta Praha players
Ice hockey people from Prague
Wichita Thunder players
Czech expatriate ice hockey players in Canada
Czech expatriate ice hockey players in the United States